Ayşe Sultan ("the living one" or "womanly"; 10 October 1715 – 9 July 1775), also called Küçuk Ayşe, was an Ottoman princess, the daughter of Sultan Ahmed III and his consort Musli Emine Kadın.

Life

Birth
Ayşe Sultan was born on 10 October 1715 in the Topkapı Palace. Her father was Sultan Ahmed III and her mother was Musli Emine Kadın (called also Muslıhe, Muslu or Musalli). She had a younger full sister named Zübeyde Sultan. At her birth, she was nicknamed Küçük Ayşe, meaning Ayşe "the younger", to distinguish her from her cousin Ayşe "the eldest" (Büyük Ayşe), daughter of Mustafa II.

Marriages
In 1728, when Ayşe Sultan was thirten years old, Ahmed betrothed her to his swordbearer Kunduracızade Istanbullu Mehmed Pasha, and appointed him the governor of Rumelia. The marriage contract was concluded on 28 September 1728, and the wedding took place on 4 October 1728 at the Topkapı Palace. The couple were given the Valide Kethüdası Mehmed Pasha Palace, located at Süleymaniye as their residence, but the marriage was consummated only in 1733. In 1730, the grand vizier Nevşehirli Damat Ibrahim Pasha was killed in the uprising of Patrona Halil and Ahmed III was deposed. Ayşe Sultan's husband, Mehmed Pasha, became the grand vizier in October 1730. He remained grand vizier until January 1731, after which he was appointed, the governor of Aleppo. He died in 1738.

Following Mehmed Pasha's death, she married Hatip Ahmed Pasha, the son of grand vizier Topal Osman Pasha. The wedding took place in 1740 at the Ortaköy Palace, while the marriage was consummated in December 1742 at the Demirkapı Palace. Ahmed Pasha was appointed the governor of Mora in 1744 and died in 1748. Ayşe had a daughter with him .

Ten years after Ahmed Pasha's death, she married Silahdar Mehmed Pasha, the Sanjak Bey (provincial governor) of Tirhala. This wedding took place on 16 January 1758 at the Hekimbaşı Palace. Her dowry was 5000 ducats. Ayşe hated this husband and she refused to live with him in the same palace.

Following the death of Ayşe "the eldest" in 1752, her palace in Zeyrek was allocated to her.

Death
Ayşe Sultan died on 9 July 1775 at the age of fifty-nine, at the Ortaköy Palace and was buried in Turhan Sultan's mausoleum, located at New Mosque at Istanbul.

Issue
By her second marriage Ayşe Sultan had a daughter: 
Rukiye Hanımsultan (1744 - 1780). She married Lalazade Nuri Bey.

Charities and properties
There are two foundations in her name. The first of these dates to 1743. The second foundation dating back to 1776, was made after her death.

Her father had assigned her the palaces of Rami Pasha and Bahariye Palace (Mansion). She also owned lands and endowments in Izmit and Ankara.

Ancestry

References

Sources

 

18th-century Ottoman princesses
1715 births
1776 deaths